The Chula Vista City Hall is the seat of the government of the city of Chula Vista, California. The city hall was built in 1923 on Third Avenue in the recently incorporated city, and it served the city until it was replaced by a new structure in 1951. The city hall initially also served as the headquarters for the fire and police departments. It houses the five members of City Council, which includes the mayor.

References

Buildings and structures in Chula Vista, California
City halls in California
Government of Chula Vista, California